This is a partial list of Jupiter's  trojans (60° ahead of Jupiter) with numbers 600001–700000 .

600001–700000 

This list contains 183 objects sorted in numerical order.

top

References 
 

 Greek_6
Jupiter Trojans (Trojan Camp)
Lists of Jupiter trojans